Viettesia infuscata is a moth in the subfamily Arctiinae. It was described by Hervé de Toulgoët in 1959. It is found on Madagascar.

References

Moths described in 1959
Lithosiini
Insects of Madagascar
Arctiinae
Endemic fauna of Madagascar